Senator Douglas may refer to:

Members of the United States Senate
Paul Douglas (1892–1976), U.S. Senator from Illinois from 1949 to 1967
Stephen A. Douglas (1813–1861), U.S. Senator from Illinois from 1847 to 1861

United States state senate members
Beverly B. Douglas (1822–1878), Virginia State Senate
Curtis N. Douglas (1856–1919), New York State Senate
H. B. Douglas (1888–1971), Florida State Senate
James Postell Douglas (1836–1901), Texas State Senate
Mark Douglas (politician) (1829–1900), Wisconsin State Senate
William Lewis Douglas (1845–1924), Massachusetts State Senate

See also
Brooks Douglass (born 1963), Oklahoma State Senate
Neria Douglass (born 1952), Maine State Senate